Daniel Dvoress (born July 12, 1988) is a Canadian professional poker player. He is currently the 5th biggest Canadian tournament winner.

Career
Dvoress was born in the Soviet Union and emigrated to Canada at the age of 8. 

He began playing poker in high school. He started playing online poker in November 2006 under the nicknames "Oxota" on PokerStars and "Oxotaments" on Full Tilt Poker. He turned professional after college mainly focusing on online poker. In May 2014, Dvoress won the PokerStars Spring Championship of Online Poker and receiving US$400,000 US dollars in the process. He has online tournament winnings exceeding $2.6 million.

Dvoress prefers to stay out of the spotlight and is "Vegas-averse". In 2019, he won the $250,000 buy-in no-limit hold’em tournament at the Super High Roller Bowl Bahamas after defeating the Malaysian Wai Chan, winning $4,080,000 in the process.

In August 2020, Dvoress won his first WSOP bracelet in $1,500 Millionaire Maker at the 2020 World Series of Poker Online and received $1,489,289.

As of 2020, Dvoress's total live poker tournament winnings exceed $15,600,000.

Coaching 
Dvoress was a coach for Phil Galfond’s poker training site – which since has become an online poker room as well – RunItOnce Poker.

References

External links
Dvoress on the Hendon Mob

Canadian poker players
Living people
World Series of Poker bracelet winners
1988 births